The yellow striped flounder (also known as the littlemouth flounder), Pseudopleuronectes herzensteini, is a flatfish of the family Pleuronectidae. It is a demersal saltwater fish that occurs in the temperate waters of the northwestern Pacific, from the Sea of Japan to the Kuril Islands, Sakhalin, Korea, the Yellow Sea, Gulf of Bohai and the East China Sea.

References

Pleuronectidae
Taxa named by David Starr Jordan
Taxa named by John Otterbein Snyder
Fish of the Pacific Ocean
Fish described  in 1901